was a Japanese poet. He was one of the pioneers of Dadaism in Japan. According to Makoto Ueda, he is also the only major Zen poet of modern Japanese literature.

He was born on Shikoku.

His Collected Poems won the Japanese Ministry of Education Prize for Art.

Works
Dadaist Shinkichi's Poetry 1923
Triumph of the Sparrow: Zen Poems of Shinkichi Takahashi Translated by Lucien Stryk and Takashi Ikemoto. Grove Press, 2000
After Images: Zen Poems by Shinkichi Takahashi Translated by Lucien Stryk and Takashi Ikemoto. Doubleday, Anchor Books, 1972
 (verse)
Spanish translation: En la quietud del mundo. Translated by José Luis Fernández Castillo and Kyoko Mizoguchi. Madrid, Pre-textos, 2018.

Notes

Japanese Zen Buddhists
1901 births
1987 deaths
Dada
20th-century Japanese poets